Annie Homasi is a Tuvalu community leader. She is Executive Director of the Tuvalu Association of Non-Government Organisations (TANGO), an umbrella organization for NGOs in Tuvalu.

In 2006 Homasi made an unsuccessful bid to enter parliament, standing against the caretaker Prime Minister Maatia Toafa.

Homasi received an OBE from the United Kingdom for her public and community service in the 2003 New Year Honours.

References

Year of birth missing (living people)
Living people
Officers of the Order of the British Empire
Tuvaluan women